The 2001 UEFA Regions' Cup was the second UEFA Regions' Cup. It was held in the Czech Republic and won by the Central Moravia team from the host nation, which beat Portugal's Braga 4–2 on penalties, after drawing 2–2 after extra time, in the final.

Preliminary round 
The 35 teams entered were drawn into eight groups of four and one group of three, with the following countries hosting each group's matches:
Group 1 – 
Group 2 – 
Group 3 – 
Group 4 – 
Group 5 – 
Group 6 – 
Group 7 – 
Group 8 – 
Group 9 – 
Seven group winners automatically qualified for the final tournament, with the two "worst winners" playing against each other in a playoff for the remaining place.

Group 1 

All matches played in Pleven.

Group 2

Group 3 

All matches played in Joensuu.

Group 4 

Matches played in Fos-sur-Mer, Martigues and Istres.

Group 5

Group 6

Group 7

Group 8

Group 9

Playoff 
The two teams which won their groups with the fewest available points went through to compete in a playoff for the remaining final tournament place. In the event of multiple teams sharing the same number of points, the points margin and score between first and second places was taken into account. The two legs were played in both teams' home regions.

|}

First leg

Second leg

Final tournament 
The Czech Republic was chosen to host the final tournament, with matches being played from 18 June to 24 June 2001.

Group stage 
The seven automatic preliminary group winners and the playoff winner Vojvodina were drawn into two groups of four, with the two group winners advancing to the final.

Group A

Group B

Final

See also 
UEFA Regions' Cup

External links
Official UEFA Regions' Cup site
RSSSF page for the 2001 UEFA Regions' Cup

2001
Regions' Cup